Peder Ragnar Holt (25 January 1899–24 March 1963) was a Norwegian politician for the Labour Party.  He was the first person from Finnmark county to be the Governor of Finnmark, a position he held from 1948 until his death in 1963.  He was instrumental in the reconstruction and rebuilding of Finnmark after World War II.

Personal life
He was born in the town of Vardø in Finnmark county in the far northern part of Norway. He participated in the Left Communist Youth League's military strike action in 1924. He agitated for it through the newspaper Finmarken, and was convicted for this crime and sentenced to 50 days of light detention.  He died on 24 March 1963 in the town of Vadsø where he was serving as county governor.  He was a Commander of the 1st class of the Order of the Lion of Finland.

Education and career
He worked in fish farming in his youth, but then he went on and got an education.  He worked as the editor of the newspaper Finmarken from 1924 until 1940.  He served as the mayor of Vardø Municipality from 1930 to 1940. During the occupation of Norway he was forced to resign all of his jobs (newspaper editor and mayor) because he refused to support the Nasjonal Samling government. 

In 1943, Holt was drawn into the Norwegian government in exile's secret preparation for the liberation of Finnmark. On the way to such a meeting in Vadsø in May 1944, the freight vessel Holt was aboard was attacked by Soviet navy vessels, and the crew and passengers were led to Murmansk. In November the same year, while the liberation of camps throughout Øst-Finnmark continued and the Germans were burning towns, a Soviet vessel brought Holt back to Vardø.  Once there, he led a three-member administration council for the liberated areas of Finnmark, according to a plan developed at a secret meeting in Tromsø the year before and approved by the government-in-exile in London.  Shortly after this, Holt was named the acting County Governor of Finnmark since the actual governor, Hans Gabrielsen, was still imprisoned by the Germans.  He held this post from November 1944 until September 1945.  During this time, he was granted extra-ordinary powers for a governor and he was able to appoint municipal mayors and the county council so that the civil administration of the county could be restored quickly.

After the German occupation of Norway and the war ended, he was appointed Consultative Minister of Supplies and Reconstruction for northern Troms and Finnmark from 1945–1948 during Gerhardsen's Second Cabinet.  In 1948, Governor Hans Gabrielsen was appointed as the Governor of Oppland county and Holt was appointed to replace him as the county governor of Finnmark.  Several years later in 1951, he was appointed to be the Minister of Fisheries in Torp's Cabinet.  Dag Tønder was installed as acting governor in Finnmark while he was in the cabinet. In 1955, he left the cabinet and resumed his duties as Governor of Finnmark, a position he held until his death in 1963.

References

1899 births
1963 deaths
People from Vardø
County governors of Norway
Government ministers of Norway
Labour Party (Norway) politicians
Norwegian prisoners and detainees
Prisoners and detainees of Norway